{{DISPLAYTITLE:C23H32N2O3}}
The molecular formula C23H32N2O3 (molar mass: 384.512 g/mol, exact mass: 384.2413 u) may refer to:

 MDMB-CHMICA
 Zipeprol

Molecular formulas